The Sir-Karl-Popper-Schule is an integral part of a public secondary school named Wiedner Gymnasium located in the 4th district of Vienna. It is a special branch with federally granted experimental status for highly gifted pupils comprising grades 9 to 12. There are two classes per year with 24 pupils in each. Admittance is mainly based on the results of internationally acknowledged test methods conducted by an external institution.
The school is also known for its academic success, producing many recent winners of Maths and Science Competitions.

History 

The Sir-Karl-Popper-Schule was founded in 1998 by Andreas Salcher, Walter Strobl and Bernhard Görg, who, in accordance with his agreement, named the school after the famous British-Austrian Philosopher Sir Karl Popper. The School has operated as part of the Wiedner Gymnasium in the 4th district of Vienna since.

Characteristics 

The Sir Karl Popper School is nationally regarded for its demanding curriculum and rigor, which is partly due to the following special features:

 Module System:

Unlike most Austrian Schools, the Sir Karl Popper Schule does not require every student to take the exact same classes, but from 10th Grade on, students are required to complete a certain amount of hours in the humanities, arts and sciences. This allows for there to be more general classes as preparation for the Matura to be offered, as well as very specific courses for accelerated students, ranging from Ancient Greek to Relativistic Physics. The school requires students to take an average of 35 hours of classes per week, however it allows students to take up to 30 percent more, which most students do.

 Mandatory Scientific Papers:

In preparation for the Vorwissenschaftliche Arbeit, the 30-page scientific paper required for successful graduation in high school in Austria, the school requires its students to write a scientific paper in 9th Grade, called Vorwissenschaftliches Erkunden, which is about 7 pages long, and a scientific paper in 10th Grade, called Vorwissenschaftliche Semesterarbeit, which is about 15 pages long. The School follows the Chicago Manual of Style.

 Communication and Social Interaction (Class):

The Sir Karl Popper Schule is the first school worldwide to offer the class "Kommunikation and Sozialkompetenz" (English: Communication and Social Interaction), a class focused on teaching theory and application of social interaction.

 EVA and Lab System:

The school encourages students to learn new material on their own which is why it introduced Eigenverantwortliches Arbeiten (self-responsible learning) for 9th and 10th Grade where students are given material to work on for a month instead of having regular lecture-like classes. In 11th and 12th Grade students have to learn new material outside of class in language, science and mathematics classes in a so called Lab System.

 Coaching (Advisory-System):

To help students thrive in the academically demanding atmosphere, they are placed into coaching groups with a dozen of their peers and a teacher who helps them with scheduling and school issues.

 School on Saturday:

In order to provide the various classes and opportunities the school introduced school on Saturday for its students. This topic has been especially controversial within its student body, as nearly a third of the students have commuting times of over an hour to school.

External links 
 
 

Schools in Vienna
Buildings and structures in Wieden
Gifted education